Heuksodol (흑수돌) is a character in Dae Jo Yeong (TV series), another sworn brother of Dae Jo Yeong and also with Geol sabiu. His wife is Uh-hong. He was once Yeon Namseng's (Yeon Gaesomun's son) follower when Goguryeo was alive but when Yeon Namseng betrays him, he goes with Dae Jo Yeong and Geol sabiu and soon becomes friends, having a brother relationship. Heuksodul is very skilled in fighting but in some way stupid.

He follows along with Dae Joyoung and Geol Sabiwu in the struggle to help revive Goguryeo and faces many times of victory as well as failure. He dies just before the real clash at the battle of Chunmunryeong. He nearly killed General Li wen of Tang but a sword pierced him through the back. His soldiers all died and he was caught. General Li Haego orders him executed.

Popular culture
 Portrayed by Kim Hak-cheol in 2006–2007 KBS TV series Dae Jo Yeong.

Dae Jo Yeong characters